Gina G. Turrigiano is an American neuroscientist, and is the Levitan Chair of Vision Science at Brandeis University.

Turrigiano is known for her pioneering work on the mechanisms that allow brain circuits  to remain both flexible  and stable. Turrigiano and colleagues discovered several forms of "homeostatic" plasticity, most notably Synaptic Scaling, and have characterized how this form of plasticity contributes to learning and experience-dependent plastic changes in the brain. 

She graduated from Reed College, B.A., and from University of California, San Diego, with a Ph.D.
She now lives in Weston, MA with her husband, Sacha Nelson (also a neuroscientist). She has two children, Gabriel Turrigiano Nelson, and Raphael Nelson Turrigiano.

Notable Awards and Honors
 2022 President, Society for Neuroscience
 2018 Fellow, American Association for the Advancement of Science
 2015 Javitz Neuroscience Investigator Award
 2013 Elected Member, National Academy of Sciences (USA)
 2012 Elected Member, American Academy of Arts and Sciences (USA)
 2012 HFSP Nakasone Award
 2007 NIH Directors Pioneer Award
 2000 MacArthur Fellows Program
 1996 National Institutes of Health Career Development Award
 1996 Alfred P. Sloan Foundation Fellowship

Works
Turrigiano has published >100 research articles  in her field; her complete scholarship can be found here https://scholar.google.com/citations?user=lAjsH-wAAAAJ&hl=en
"Homeostatic Regulation of Cortical Networks", Toward a theory of neuroplasticity, Editors Christopher Ariel Shaw, Jill McEachern, Psychology Press, 2001, 
"Behavioral Correlates of Stomagrastric Network Function", Dynamic biological networks: the stomatogastric nervous system, Editor Ronald M. Harris-Warrick, MIT Press, 1992,

References

External links
"Gina G. Turrigiano", Scientific Commons
"Gina G Turrigiano", Neurotree

American neuroscientists
American women neuroscientists
Living people
Brandeis University faculty
Reed College alumni
University of California, San Diego alumni
MacArthur Fellows
Year of birth missing (living people)
Fellows of the American Academy of Arts and Sciences
People from Weston, Massachusetts